The Crown Debts Act 1541 (33 Hen 8 c 39) was an Act of the Parliament of England, which introduced the concept of crown debt in English law, i.e. that the crown has priority for its debts before all other creditors.

The whole Act was repealed by section 152(4) of, and Schedule 7 to, the Supreme Court Act 1981.

References
Halsbury's Statutes,

Acts of the Parliament of England (1485–1603)
1541 in law
1541 in England